The Santa Fe Ring was a group of powerful attorneys and land speculators in the United States during the late 19th century and into the early 20th century. It amassed a fortune through political corruption and fraudulent land deals. Many prominent people in New Mexico Territory including future Senator and Secretary of War Stephen Benton Elkins were implicated. The ring figured into the various range wars and feud such as the Pecos War, Lincoln County War, and the Colfax County War.

The ring name was applied to almost all state politicians in the state capital in Santa Fe, New Mexico, who had near total control of the state during the late 19th and early 20th centuries and were said to turn a blind eye to or be actively involved in corruption.  The most infamous period involving the ring was in the 1870s, when ownership of huge Spanish land grants was sorted out.

Membership were accused of selling to farmers new to the area land that in fact was not owned by the sellers. They were said to obtain government contracts to supply beef to American Indians on reservations, obtaining the contracts through corrupt political contacts, but with them supplying either less beef than the contract called for, or a poor quality of meat, often spoiled.

History

Businessman and Union Army veteran Lawrence Murphy became a key figure in the ring during the 1860s, alongside his German-American partner Emil Fritz, forming "L.G. Murphy & Co." in 1866.

Murphy and Fritz were able to obtain false deeds to land, then sold that land, not actually owned by them, to newly arriving farmers and ranchers. When payments were missed, Murphy and Fritz would foreclose on the land, cattle, or crops. Within a very short time they were wealthy men. During that same period they acquired government contracts to supply beef and vegetables to Apache Native Americans living on the reservation, which they typically did not supply, at least not in the quantities called for in the contracts. However, as they were protected by their political contacts who also were tied into the ring, complaints by the Native Americans went with little notice or attention.

In 1869, Murphy hired James Dolan to work as a clerk for his company. Murphy's business, located in Lincoln, New Mexico, very quickly became the only supplier to local ranchers and farmers, with Murphy, Fritz, Dolan and businessman John H. Riley developing it into a monopoly. Owing to the absence of competition, they were able to charge high prices for their goods, angering many in the area. By 1877, with the backing of wealthy rancher John Chisum, rancher John Tunstall and businessman Alexander McSween opened rival businesses, enraging Murphy and Dolan. Murphy by this time was in the first stages of cancer, but remained involved in decisionmaking for his business.

He, Dolan and Riley hired the Jesse Evans Gang and the John Kinney Gang, both outlaw gangs of the time, to goad Tunstall into a fight. Both gangs began rustling Tunstall's cattle, and to counter them Tunstall hired numerous small-scale ranchers and cowboys as bodyguards. Former Murphy employee Dick Brewer served as Tunstall's foreman, with gunmen Doc Scurlock, Charlie Bowdre, and ranchers Frank Coe and George Coe rounding out the group. Frank McNab would also hire on, as would Billy the Kid and Ab Saunders.

This set the stage for what would become known as the Lincoln County War, sparked by the February 18, 1878 murder of Tunstall by Jesse Evans and members of his gang. The Tunstall faction formed the Lincoln County Regulators. On February 18, 1879, Evans murdered attorney Huston Chapman, who was representing Susan McSween's interests on behalf of her dead husband and the Regulators. By October 1878, Murphy had died from cancer. Subsequently James Dolan took active control of the Murphy-Dolan interests.

New Mexico Territorial Representative Juan Patron became an advocate for Susan McSween, becoming involved as opposition to the ring following the murders of two local Hispanic businessmen in Lincoln County. On April 9, 1884, Patron was shot and killed by cowboy Michael Maney in Puerto De Luna, after having received numerous threats owing to his opposition to the Santa Fe Ring. Maney was arrested, and stood trial represented by several prominent attorneys. The prosecutor in the case was Santa Fe Ring member Thomas B. Catron, and Maney was acquitted. Catron was tightly allied with Albert Fall who would be implicated in the Teapot Dome scandal.

According to legend the rerouting of U.S. Route 66 to avoid Santa Fe and instead pass through Albuquerque was done at the behest of Democratic Governor Arthur T. Hannett to punish the ring.

Footnotes

Further reading
 David L. Caffey, Chasing the Santa Fe Ring: Power and Privilege in Territorial New Mexico. Albuquerque, NM: University of New Mexico Press, 2014.
 Kathleen P. Chamberlain, In the Shadow of Billy the Kid: Susan McSween and the Lincoln County War. 2013.

External links
Santa Fe Ring and the Lincoln county War
Crime Library, Lincoln County War
Lawrence Murphy
Lawrence Murphy, Scoundrel of the Lincoln County War
Juan Patron
Juan Patron, Lincoln County
Billy the Kid, Juan Patron, Santa Fe Ring
New Mexico History, Santa Fe Ring
Friends and Enemies to Billy the Kid

New Mexico Territory
American frontier
Political scandals in the United States